The 2016–17 Denver Pioneers men's ice hockey team represented University of Denver in intercollegiate college ice hockey during the 2016–17 NCAA Division I men's ice hockey season. The head coach was Jim Montgomery and the team captain was Will Butcher.  The team won the 2017 NCAA Division I men's ice hockey tournament. The team's leading scorer was Troy Terry.

Season
Denver entered its fourth year under Jim Montgomery looking to continue several trends. The Pioneers had increased their wins and winning percentage over each of the previous two seasons and had yet to miss appearing in the NCAA tournament with Montgomery behind the bench. After a semifinal finish in the 2016 championship DU was projected to be a contender for the 2017 title and was ranked 3rd in the preseason. Denver opened their season as the host for the Ice Breaker Tournament and fell flat on their face, losing both games and finishing last in the four-team tournament.

After that inauspicious beginning the Pioneers collected themselves and played host to #2 Boston University, winning both games. Denver finished out the month with four more wins against weaker teams and moved all the way up to #2 in the nation before their big series in North Dakota against the Fighting Hawks. The Pioneers battled the defending national champions to a 1–1 draw in the first game before losing in the 3–on–3 overtime session (which only gave UND a single point in the NCHC standings) then won a 3–2 defensive struggle in the second game. For their efforts Denver rose to #1 in the country but after tying the lowly Miami RedHawks twice they slipped below conference rival Minnesota–Duluth. Denver held the #2 ranking through a pair of wins against long-time rival Colorado College before meeting UMD for their final weekend before the winter break. In the first game Denver rode a tremendous second period to a 4–3 win but could only manage a single goal in the rematch and lost 1–3, leaving the top two teams ranked exactly where they were before the series.

The Pioneers did not play in a holiday tournament but instead went to Rhode Island for a series against the 2015 champion Providence Friars. Denver got more than it could handle from the Friars, getting a bloody nose from their unranked opponent. The Pioneers returned home for a weekend before hitting the road for two consecutive weeks, splitting both series before returning to Colorado to face #18 Omaha. Despite some of their recent struggles Denver was still ranked #3 in the country and showed just how goo they could be by winning every remaining game on their schedule. DU entered its final weekend with the NCHC championship already won and after sweeping Omaha on the road they had the #1 ranking sewn up as well as the best record in the nation.

Denver opened the NCHC Tournament at home against 8-win Colorado College and easily handles the Tigers, winning the two matches by a total score of 8–1 and outshooting their in-state rival 77–39. The Pioneers headed to Minnesota for the semifinal and played North Dakota in front of partisan Fighting Hawk crowd. Despite several close calls Denver was unable to score on UND and the Hawks lone goal served as the game-winner. While the highly anticipated rematch against Minnesota–Duluth never happened, Denver did redeem themselves the next night with a 3–1 win over #8 Western Michigan. Even with their slip up in the semifinal, Denver retained the #1 ranking and went to Cincinnati as the #1 overall seed.

The pioneers opened the 2017 Tournament against WCHA champion Michigan Tech and dominated the Huskies, scoring the first five goals of the game and riding the outburst to a relatively easy 5–2 win. In the Midwest Final Denver met Penn State who, despite being in their first tournament, had won their opening game 10–3. Denver again got an early start, going up 2–0 before the Lions tied the game early in the second period. The DU offense roared a second time in the middle frame with three more goals while Troy Terry finished off his hat trick with an empty net goal in the third.

In the Frozen Four semifinal in Chicago, Denver opened against a surprising Notre Dame squad who were looking for their third consecutive upset but the buzzsaw that was the DU offense cut down the Fighting Irish with the first five goals of the game. Notre Dame was only able to manage 16 shots in the contest and scored a power play goal on their only opportunity of the night. The Pioneers made the championship game and were finally able to play the rubber match against Minnesota–Duluth in front of 19,783 fans. The two teams fought a close first period but neither could manage to score. just under five minutes into the second Jarid Lukosevicius opened the scoring with his 14th of the season and added a second goal 16 seconds later. Duluth cut the lead in half with an Alex Iafallo power play marker a short while later but Lukosevicius completed his hat trick before the end of the period and Denver took a 3–1 lead into the final frame. The Pioneers weathered a furious onslaught by the Bulldogs, with Tanner Jaillet facing 17 shots in the third. Riley Tufte cut the lead to one with just over five minutes remaining but UMD was unable to even the score and Denver skated to its 8th national title. Lukosevicius' hat trick was the first in a title game since 1993 scored by his coach, Jim Montgomery.

Just before the championship game, team captain Will Butcher was announced as the winner of the 2017 Hobey Baker Award joining a slew of other awards by Denver players including the Mike Richter Award (Tanner Jaillet), NCHC Player of the Year (Butcher), NCHC Rookie of the Year (Henrik Borgström), NCHC Goaltender of the Year (Jaillet), NCHC Offensive Defenseman of the Year (Butcher) and the NCAA Tournament Most Outstanding Player Jarid Lukosevicius. Additionally Butcher was named to the All-American First Team while Jaillet made the second team. Both players made the NCHC First Team, Henrik Borgström and Dylan Gambrell each made the conference Second Team while Borgström and Michael Davies both made the All-NCHC Rookie Team.

Standings

Schedule

|-
!colspan=12 style="color:white; background:#862633; " | Exhibition

|-
!colspan=12 style="color:white; background:#862633; " | Regular Season
|-
!colspan=12 style="color:white; background:#862633; " | 

|-
!colspan=12 style="color:white; background:#862633; " | 

|-
!colspan=12 style="color:white; background:#862633; " | 

† Jailley and Cowley both played in the game and shared the shut out though neither officially receives credit for it.

Roster and scoring statistics

Goaltending Statistics

2017 national championship

(MW1) Denver vs. (W1) Minnesota–Duluth

See also 
2018 NCAA Division I men's ice hockey tournament
List of NCAA Division I men's ice hockey tournament champions

References

External links 

Denver Pioneers men's ice hockey seasons
Denver
Denver
Denver
Denver
Denver
Denver